The 1973 Wichita State Shockers football team was an American football team that represented Wichita State University as a member of the Missouri Valley Conference (MVC) during the 1973 NCAA Division I football season. In their fourth year under head coach Bob Seaman, the team compiled an overall record of 4–7 with a mark of 2–4 in conference play, finishing in fifth place in the MVC.

Schedule

References

Wichita State
Wichita State Shockers football seasons
Wichita State Shockers football